The Bleriot-SPAD S.82 was a French advertising aircraft built in the late 1920s.

Design
The S.82 was a biplane with a monocoque fuselage of wood and canvas construction. It was built to tow billboards in the air.

Specifications

References

SPAD aircraft
Biplanes
Single-engined tractor aircraft
Aircraft first flown in 1926